Al Nasr Sporting Club, is an Egyptian football club based in Cairo, Egypt. The club is currently playing in the Egyptian Second Division, the second highest league in the Egyptian football league system.

History
Al Nasr was very close to promote to the Egyptian Premier League for its first time ever during the 2008–09 Egyptian Second Division season; but a 2–2 draw with Suez Cement in the last week secured the promotion spot for El Entag El Harby to the 2009–10 Egyptian Premier League instead. However, Al Nasr were able to finally clinch promotion for the first time in their history during the 2013–14 Egyptian Second Division season. Al Nasr ended that season in second place.

Current squad
Egyptian Football Association (EFA) rules are that an Egyptian team can only have 3 foreign born players in the squad.

(captain)

References

External links
 Official Club Page 

Egyptian Second Division
Football clubs in Egypt
Football clubs in Cairo
1958 establishments in Egypt
Association football clubs established in 1958